Stade de Beaumer, also known as Stade de Moroni, is a multi-use stadium in Moroni, the capital city of the Comoros. It is currently used mostly for football matches.

History
The stadium was built in 1985. A new venue, Stade Said Mohamed Cheikh, was to be built as the Stade de Beaumer is considered insufficient, following Comoros's recent membership in FIFA.

References

Football venues in the Comoros
Buildings and structures in Moroni, Comoros